This is a ranking of the highest grossing Indian films which includes films from various languages based on the conservative global box office estimates as reported by reputable sources. There is no official tracking of domestic box office figures within India, and Indian sites publishing data are frequently pressured to increase their domestic box office estimates.

Indian films have been screened in markets around the world since the early 20th century. As of 2003, there are markets in over 90 countries where films from India are screened. During the first decade of the 21st century, there was a steady rise in the ticket price, a tripling in the number of theaters and an increase in the number of prints of a film being released, which led to a large increase in the box office collections.

The majority of highest-grossing Indian films are Hindi films. As of 2014, Hindi cinema represents 43% of the net box office revenue in India, while Tamil and Telugu cinema represent 36%, and other industries constitute 21%. In 2019, the Hindi film industry represented 44% of box office revenue, followed by the Telugu and the Tamil film industries, each representing 13%. Other prominent languages in the Indian film industry include Malayalam and Kannada, representing 5% each, as well as Bengali, Marathi, Odia, Punjabi, Gujarati and Bhojpuri. As of 2020, the combined revenue of all other language film industries has surpassed that of the Hindi film industry, By 2021, Telugu cinema became the largest film industry of India in terms of box-office.

See List of highest-grossing films in India for domestic gross figures and List of highest-grossing Indian films in the overseas markets for overseas gross figures.

Global gross figures
The following table lists the top 50 highest-grossing Indian films, which include films from all Indian languages. The figures are not adjusted for inflation.

The following list of films is sorted in terms of Indian rupees. Currency conversions to US dollars are also given as reference points, as many of these films had international releases. However, the currency conversions may not be consistent, as the dollar-rupee exchange rate has varied over time, from 48 rupees per dollar in 2009 to over 65 rupees per dollar in 2017. The exchange rate varied even more greatly prior to 2009, so a number of older films which grossed highly in terms of US dollars are under-represented on this list; see Highest-grossing films by year below for gross figures of older films.

{| class="wikitable sortable" style="margin:auto; margin:auto;"
|-
! Rank
! Peak
! Film
! Year
! Director
! Studio(s)
! Primary  language
! Worldwide gross
! class="unsortable" | 
|- 
| 1
| 1
| Dangal
| 2016
| Nitesh Tiwari
| Aamir Khan Productions  UTV Motion Pictures  Walt Disney Studios India
| Hindi
| 
| 
|-
| 2
| 1
| Baahubali 2: The Conclusion 
| 2017
| S. S. Rajamouli
| Arka Media Works
| TeluguTamil
| 
| 
|-
| 3
| 3
| style="background:#b6fcb6;" |  RRR * 
| 2022
| S. S. Rajamouli
| DVV Entertainments
| Telugu
| –
|
|-
| 4
| 3
|K.G.F: Chapter 2
| 2022
| Prashanth Neel
| Hombale Films
| Kannada
| -
|
|-
|5
|5
| style="background:#b6fcb6;" |Pathaan *
|2023
|Siddharth Anand
|Yash Raj Films
|Hindi
| 
|
|-
| 6
| 3
| Bajrangi Bhaijaan 
| 2015
| Kabir Khan
| Salman Khan Films  Kabir Khan Films  Eros International
| Hindi
| 
|
|-
| 7
| 3
| Secret Superstar
| 2017
| Advait Chandan
| Aamir Khan Productions
| Hindi
| 
| 
|-
| 8
| 1
| PK
| 2014
| Rajkumar Hirani
| Vinod Chopra Films  Rajkumar Hirani Films
| Hindi 
| 
| 
|-
| 9
| 5
| 2.0
| 2018
| S. Shankar
| Lyca Productions
| Tamil
| – 
|
|-
| 10
| 4
| Sultan
| 2016
| Ali Abbas Zafar
| Yash Raj Films
| Hindi
| 
| 
|-
|11
|2
|Baahubali: The Beginning
|2015
|S. S. Rajamouli
|Arka Media Works
|TeluguTamil
|
|{{efn|Box Office India mentioned it as ₹599.72 crore. While India Today and The Indian Express mentioned the collection as ₹600 crore. But Firstpost said that the collection was ₹650 crore.}}
|-
| 12
| 8
| Sanju| 2018
| Rajkumar Hirani
| Rajkumar Hirani FilmsVinod Chopra Films
| Hindi
| 
| 
|-
| 13
| 7
| Padmaavat| 2018
| Sanjay Leela Bhansali
| Bhansali Productions Viacom 18 Motion Pictures
| Hindi
| 
| 
|-
| 14
| 8
| Tiger Zinda Hai| 2017
| Ali Abbas Zafar
| Yash Raj Films
| Hindi
| 
| 
|-
| 15
| 1
| Dhoom 3| 2013
| Vijay Krishna Acharya
| Yash Raj Films
| Hindi
| 
| 
|-
| 16
| 15
| Ponniyin Selvan: I|2022
|Mani Ratnam
|
|Tamil
|–
|
|- 
| 17
| 9
| War| 2019
| Siddharth Anand
| Yash Raj Films
| Hindi
| 475.50 crore ( million)
| 
|- 
| 18
| 1
| 3 Idiots| 2009
| Rajkumar Hirani
| Vinod Chopra Films
| Hindi
| 
| 
|-
| 19
| 14
| Andhadhun| 2018
| Sriram Raghavan
| Viacom 18 Motion Pictures Matchbox Pictures
| Hindi
| 456.89 crore ( million)
| 
|-
| 20
| 18
| Vikram| 2022
| Lokesh Kanagaraj
| Raaj Kamal Films International
| Tamil
|–
|
|-
| 21
| 20
| Brahmastra| 2022
| Ayan Mukerji
| Star Studios
Dharma Productions
Prime Focus[a]
Starlight Pictures
| Hindi
| 
| 
|-
| 22
| 2
| Chennai Express| 2013
|Rohit Shetty
|Red Chillies Entertainment
| Hindi
|424.54 crore ( million)
| 
|-
|23
|16
|Saaho|2019
|Sujeeth
|UV Creations  T-Series
|TeluguHindi
|—
|
|-
| 24
| 4
| Kick| 2014
| Sajid Nadiadwala
| Nadiadwala Grandson
| Hindi
| 402crore (US$million)
| 
|-
| 25
| 24
|Kantara| 2022
|Rishab Shetty
|Hombale Films
| Kannada
|
|
|-
| 26
|17
| Simmba| 2018
| Rohit Shetty
| Reliance Entertainment  Dharma Productions
| Hindi
| 
| 
|-
| 27
| 8
| Krrish 3| 2013
| Rakesh Roshan
| Filmkraft Productions Pvt. Ltd
| Hindi
| 
|
|-
|-
| 28
| 5
|Happy New Year| 2014
| Farah Khan
| Red Chillies Entertainment
| Hindi
| 
|
|-
|29
|21
|Kabir Singh|2019
|Sandeep Vanga
|Cine1 Studios  T-Series
|Hindi
|
|
|-
| 30
| 10
| Dilwale| 2015
| Rohit Shetty
| Red Chillies Entertainment Rohit Shetty Productions
| Hindi
| 376.85 crore
| 
|-
| 31
| 25
| Tanhaji 
| 2020
| Om Raut
| Ajay Devgn FFilmsT-Series
| Hindi
| 
| 
|-
| 32
| 6
| Prem Ratan Dhan Payo| 2015
| Sooraj R. Barjatya
| Fox Star Studios  Rajshri Productions
| Hindi
| 365.45crore ( million)
|
|-
|33
|26
|Uri: The Surgical Strike|2019
|Aditya Dhar
|RSVP Movies
|Hindi
|
|
|-
| 34
| 11
| Bajirao Mastani| 2015
| Sanjay Leela Bhansali
| Bhansali Productions  Eros International
| Hindi
| 
| 
|-
|35
|26
|Pushpa: The Rise|2021
|Sukumar
|Mythri Movie MakersMuttamsetty Media
|Telugu
|–
|
|-
|36
|35
|Drishyam 2|2022
|Abhishek Pathak
|T-Series Viacom18 Studios
|Hindi
|
|
|-
| 37
| 31
|The Kashmir Files|2022
|Vivek Agnihotri
|Zee Studios  Abhishek Agarwal Arts
|Hindi
|
|
|-
| 38
| 5
| Bang Bang!| 2014
| Siddharth Anand
| Fox Star Studios
| Hindi
| 
| 
|-
| 39
| 21
| Thugs of Hindostan| 2018
| Vijay Krishna Acharya
| Yash Raj Films
| Hindi
| 
| 
|-
| 40
| 2
| Ek Tha Tiger| 2012
| Kabir Khan
| Yash Raj Films
| Hindi
| 
| 
|-
|41
|30
|Bharat
|2019
|Ali Abbas Zafar
|Reel Life Productions  Salman Khan FilmsT-Series
|Hindi
|
|
|-
| 42
| 19
| Hindi Medium| 2017
| Saket Chaudhary
| T-Series
| Hindi
| 
| 
|-
| 43
|2
| Enthiran| 2010
| S.Shankar
| Sun Pictures
| Tamil
|
|
|-
| 44
| 3
| Yeh Jawaani Hai Deewani| 2013
| Ayan Mukerji
| Dharma Productions
| Hindi
| 
| 
|-
|45
|34
|Good Newwz|2019
|Raj Mehta
|Zee StudiosDharma Productions
|Hindi
|
|
|-
| 46
| 22
| Toilet: Ek Prem Katha| 2017
| Shree Narayan Singh
| Viacom 18 Motion Pictures
| Hindi
| 
| 
|-
| 47
| 19
|Golmaal Again| 2017
| Rohit Shetty
| Rohit Shetty Productions
| Hindi
| 
| 
|-
| 48
| 18
| Raees| 2017
| Rahul Dholakia
| Red Chillies Entertainment
| Hindi
| 
| 
|-
| 49
| 31
|Race 3|2018
|Remo D'Souza
|Salman Khan Films  Tips Industries
|Hindi
|
|
|-
|50
|20
|Kabali|2016
|Pa. Ranjith
|V Creations
|Tamil
|
|
|-
|}

Highest-grossing films by language
Bengali cinema was the center of Indian cinema in the 1930s, and accounted for a quarter of India's film output in the 1950s. Cinema in South India accounted for nearly half of India's cinema halls in the 1940s.

Assamese
Assamese cinema is based in the state of Assam and produces films in Assamese language.

Bengali

Bengali cinema is the Bengali language film industry centered in the Tollygunge neighborhood of Kolkata, West Bengal. It has been known by the nickname Tollywood, a portmanteau of the words Tollygunge and Hollywood, since 1932.

Bhojpuri
The Bhojpuri cinema produces films in the Bhojpuri language. 

Gujarati
The Gujarati cinema produces films in Gujarati language and is primarily focused on the audience in Gujarat and Mumbai. The film industry is sometimes referred to as Dhollywood or Gollywood.

Hindi 

The Hindi language film industry, based in Mumbai, India, is frequently known as Bollywood. Bollywood is one of the largest film producer in India and one of the largest centres of film production in the world.

Kannada

Bangalore is the center for the Kannada cinema produced in the Kannada language. It is sometimes known by the nickname Sandalwood.

Malayalam

Malayalam cinema is a part of Indian cinema based in Kerala dedicated to the production of motion pictures in the Malayalam language. It is sometimes known by the nickname "Mollywood" by certain media outlets.

Marathi
The Marathi cinema industry produces films in the Marathi language and is based in the state of Maharashtra, India. India's first full-length film, Raja Harishchandra, was released in 1913 in Marathi.

 

Odia
Odia cinema is primarily based in Odisha state producing movies mainly in the Odia language and a few movies in Sambalpuri language. The first Odia movie was Sita Vivaha which was released in 1936.

Punjabi

Punjabi cinema, producing films in the Punjabi language, is primarily based in the state of Punjab, India.

Tamil

Tamil cinema, the Tamil language film industry is based in the Kodambakkam neighbourhood of Chennai, Tamil Nadu, India. It is sometimes colloquially known as "Kollywood", a portmanteau of Kodambakkam and Hollywood.

Highest-grossing films by year

Highest-grossing franchises and film series
The Khiladi franchise was the first film franchise to gross over 100crore, followed by the Krrish film series. Baahubali'' is the first franchise to collect over 1,000crore at the box office, and the only franchise where all the films have grossed at least 500crore worldwide.

See also

 List of highest-grossing Hindi films
 List of highest-grossing South Indian films
 List of highest-grossing films in India
 List of highest-grossing Indian films by international revenue
 List of most expensive Indian films
 100 Crore Club
 1000 Crore Club
 Lists of highest-grossing films

Notes

References

Lists of Indian films
Indian worldwide